Azoychka is a yellow Russian beefsteak heirloom tomato. The regular multi-locular structure distinguishes it from brandywine types.

See also
List of tomato cultivars

References

External links
Azoychka  at Tatiana's Tomatobase

Heirloom tomato cultivars